Horia or Horea may refer to:

Places in Romania

Communes
Horea, Alba
Horia, Constanța
Horia, Neamț
Horia, Tulcea
Hilișeu-Horia, Botoșani

Villages
Horea, in Sanislău, Satu Mare
Horia, in Vladimirescu, Arad
Horia, in Surdila-Greci, Brăila
Horia, in Mitoc, Botoșani
Horia, in Axintele, Ialomiţa

Other places
Horea, Satu Mare, a residential district

Other uses 
Horea, leader of a Romanian revolt in 1784
Horia (beetle)
Horia (name), a Romanian given name
Horia (Bretan), a 1937 opera
Horia, an opera by Sabin Drăgoi
Horea, a small river in Romania and Hungary, tributary of the Crasna

See also 
 Hora (disambiguation)
 Horațiu
 Horești (disambiguation)